Stan Kyles (born February 26, 1961, in Chicago) is a former minor league baseball pitcher, who served as the bullpen coach for the Milwaukee Brewers.

Playing career
Kyles was selected in the 4th round (90th overall pick) by the Chicago Cubs in the 1979 amateur entry draft. That year he played his first season for the Rookie league Gulf Coast Cubs.

The next year, he played for the Class A-Low Geneva Cubs. He started 1981 off with Geneva before advancing to the Class A Quad City Cubs. In 1982, he played for the Class A-Advanced Salinas Spurs and recorded an 11–5 record with a 2.51 ERA and pitched 118 strikeouts. In 1983, he played for both the Double-A Midland Cubs and the Triple-A Iowa Cubs.

He was traded from the Cubs to the Oakland Athletics for Tim Stoddard during spring training on March 26, 1984, with minor league outfielder Stan Boderick also sent to the A's to complete the transaction five days later on March 31. His time in the Athletics organization began at its Double-A club, the Albany-Colonie A's. He advanced to their Triple-A club, the Tacoma Tigers, the following season. In 1986, he split the season between Tacoma and Oakland's new Double-A affiliate, the Huntsville Stars. He spent 1987, his last season with Oakland, at Tacoma.

Kyles switched organizations in 1988, playing for the Los Angeles Angels of Anaheim's Triple-A club, the Albuquerque Dukes. In 1989, his final season as a player, Kyles played for two different organizations' Double-A clubs: the San Francisco Giants' Shreveport Captains and the Milwaukee Brewers' El Paso Diablos.

After 11 seasons as a professional pitcher in the minor leagues, playing in 279 games, Kyles retired. His career totals include a 52–56 record, a 3.86 ERA, and 508 strikeouts.

Coaching career

After retiring from playing, Kyles became involved with coaching in 1991. He worked in the Chicago Cubs' and Colorado Rockies' farm system prior to joining the Milwaukee Brewers organization, as a pitching coach, in 2001. His first season at the Triple-A level was 2004 with the Indianapolis Indians. The next season, the Brewers switched their top affiliate to the Nashville Sounds of the Pacific Coast League. In his first year with Nashville, the team captured the league's championship. In 2006 and 2007, his pitching staff lead the league in ERA.

After the regular 2006 season, Kyles served as the pitching coach for the Mexican Winter League's Naranjeros de Hermosillo, which won the league championship.

On Nov. 12, 2008, Kyles was named the new Milwaukee Brewers bullpen coach, replacing Bill Castro who was promoted to pitching coach. On April 20, 2010, news surfaced that Kyles was diagnosed with prostate cancer, and would be undergoing treatment on April 23. On May 25, 2010, he returned as the Brewers bullpen coach. On July 30, 2012, he was let go as the Brewers bullpen coach.

References

External links

2007 Nashville Sounds Souvenir Program. 2007.
Retrosheet

1961 births
Living people
African-American baseball coaches
Albany-Colonie A's players
Baseball players from Chicago
Sportspeople from Chicago
Major League Baseball bullpen coaches
Milwaukee Brewers coaches
Minor league baseball coaches
Gulf Coast Cubs players
Geneva Cubs players
Quad Cities Cubs players
Salinas Spurs players
Midland Cubs players
Iowa Cubs players
Tacoma Tigers players
Huntsville Stars players
Albuquerque Dukes players
Shreveport Captains players
El Paso Diablos players
21st-century African-American people
20th-century African-American sportspeople